Tilbeorht (or Tilberht) was a medieval Bishop of Hexham.

Tilbeorht was consecrated perhaps on 2 October in either 780 or 781. He died in 789.

Citations

References

External links
 

Bishops of Hexham
789 deaths
Year of birth unknown
8th-century English bishops